is a Japanese shōjo slice of life manga series by Mayumi Muroyama. With a total circulation of 28 million copies, it is one of the best-selling manga. It was adapted into an anime television series and an anime film. The TV series was produced by Toei Animation a subsidiary of Toei Company, and directed by Kazumi Fukushima. The anime follows Asari, a normal but stupid elementary school fourth-grade girl who does not get along with her family.

Manga
The manga was written by Mayumi Muroyama and serialized from the August 1978 issue to the March 2014 issue of Shogakukan's Shogaku Ninensei magazine. During its serialization it was also published in several other Shogakukan magazines, including CoroCoro Comic, Pyonpyon, Ciao, Shogaku Ichinensei, Shogaku Sannensei, Shogaku Yonnensei, and Shogaku Gonensei.

Anime
The anime was produced by Toei Animation a subsidiary of Toei Company and directed by Kazumi Fukushima. It was first broadcast in Japan on 25 January 1982, with the end last farewell final episode broadcast on 28 February 1983. It was broadcast every Monday at 19:00 until 19:30 JST, with 54 episodes. The opening theme is Ano ko wa Asari-chan (あの子はあさりちゃん) by Yoko Maekawa and the ending theme is Watashi wa Onna no ko (私は女の子) also by Maekawa.

Voice Cast 
 Katsue Miwa as Asari Hamano
 Chiyoko Kawashima as Tatami Hamano
 Kei Tomiyama as Papa
 Mariko Mukai as Mama
 Fuyumi Shiraishi as Morino Kakesu
 Jouji Yanami as Shinigami (ep 8)
 Katsuji Mori as Jirou Morino
 Kouji Totani as Dog Asari
 Noriko Tsukase  (1st voice) Michiko Nomura (2nd voice) as Ibara Yabunokouji
 Mugihito as Hachirou Kanda
 Toshiko Fujita as Futoko (ep 15)

Reception
As of December 2013, the manga had a total circulation of 28 million copies.

In 1985, Asari-chan won the 30th Shogakukan Manga Award in the category Best Children's Manga. In 2014, it won the Judging Committee Special Award at the 59th Shogakukan Manga Award. The manga won the grand award at the 2014 Japan Cartoonists Association Award.

References

External links
 
 
 

1982 anime films
1982 anime television series debuts
1980s animated short films
Japanese children's animated comedy television series
Anime series based on manga
Anime short films
Comedy anime and manga
Manga adapted into films
Manga adapted into television series
Manga series
Shogakukan manga
Shogakukan franchises
Shōjo manga
Slice of life anime and manga
Toei Animation television
TV Asahi original programming